The Ministry of Home Affairs (Pyi-dàe-yè-wun-gyì-ta-ná; abbreviated MOHA) administers Myanmar's internal affairs. The headquarters of the ministry is located in Naypyidaw. It is one of three ministries that are directly controlled by Commander-in-Chief of Defence Services

Objectives

 State Security
 Prevalence of Law and Order
 Community Peace and Tranquility
 To Carry out Social Rendering Service

Departments

Current Departments 

Union Minister Office
Myanmar Police Force
Bureau of Special Investigation
General Administration Department
Prison Department
Fire Service Department

On 28 December 2018, General Administration Department was transferred to the civilian-led Ministry of the Office of the Union Government from the Ministry of Home Affairs. After the 2021 Myanmar coup d'état, on 5 May 2021, it was reorganized under MOHA, under military leadership.

References

See also
 Cabinet of Burma

HomeAffairs
Myanmar